Samantha Harrison (born 1 February 1995) is a British long-distance runner. She finished sixth in the 10,000 metres at the 2022 Commonwealth Games in Birmingham. Harrison also placed sixth in the event at the 2022 European Championships held in Munich.

In 2019, she won the women's half marathon at the Nottingham Marathon staged in Nottingham, England.

In 2020, she competed in the women's half marathon at the 2020 World Athletics Half Marathon Championships held in Gdynia, Poland.

On 3 December 2022, she set a new parkrun record for the fastest female with a time of 15 minutes 37 seconds at Long Eaton parkrun.

References

 https://www.runnersworld.com/uk/training/motivation/a41044767/samantha-harrison/
 https://uk.news.yahoo.com/harrison-caps-consistent-season-with-sixth-place-finish-at-european-championships-085651131.html

External links
 
 Samantha Harrison at Team England
 Samantha Harrison at Power of 10

Living people
1995 births
Place of birth missing (living people)
British female long-distance runners
British female marathon runners
Athletes (track and field) at the 2022 Commonwealth Games
Commonwealth Games competitors for England
20th-century British women
21st-century British women